Beatfreak Bohemia is a mix CD by American electronic music artist Bassnectar, then known as Lorin, It was released in 2002 through Amorphous Music. It is his third mixtape release, and the second to be released on CD. It was limited to just 1,000 copies. After 1:20 of the song "Grampa Slams" is the hidden track "Seldom Vile" by Tipper.

Track listing

References 

2002 albums
Bassnectar albums